Svanesund is a locality situated in Orust Municipality, Västra Götaland County, Sweden and is located on the channel between the east side of the island and Bohusläns mainland. The population last known as of 2010 was 1,518. Agglomeration is Orust second largest after Henan and extends a few kilometers inland from the ferry situation .

References 

Populated places in Västra Götaland County
Populated places in Orust Municipality
Populated coastal places in Sweden